The Redheaded Princess is a young adult novel by Ann Rinaldi, published by HarperCollins in 2008. It tells the story of the young Elizabeth I, from age nine until she becomes Queen of England in 1558, at the age of 25. Most of the novel takes place after the death of her father, Henry VIII, during the reign of her older sister, Mary I.

External links 
 Teenreads.com

2008 American novels
Novels by Ann Rinaldi
American young adult novels
Children's historical novels
Cultural depictions of Elizabeth I
Novels set in Tudor England
HarperCollins books
Novels about royalty
2008 children's books